Oxyna dracunculina is a species of fruit fly in the family Tephritidae.

Distribution
Kazakhstan, Mongolia.

References

Tephritinae
Insects described in 1964
Diptera of Asia